Winfield Scott Hanford (1814–1884) was a one term mayor of South Norwalk, Connecticut in 1878. He was a member of the Connecticut House of Representatives in the sessions of 1875 and 1876.

He was the son of Joseph Platt Hanford and Charlotte St. John.

Associations 
 Vestryman, Trinity Church, South Norwalk 
 Member, Washington Council Number 17 of Norwalk

References 

1814 births
1884 deaths
American Episcopalians
American Freemasons
Democratic Party members of the Connecticut House of Representatives